Anatragoides is a genus of longhorn beetles of the subfamily Lamiinae, containing the following species:

 Anatragoides cylindricus Breuning, 1938
 Anatragoides exigua (Kolbe, 1893)

References

Sternotomini